The Coupe de la Ligue Final 1995 was a football match held at Parc des Princes, Paris on May 3, 1995, that saw Paris Saint-Germain defeat SC Bastia 2-0 thanks to goals by Alain Roche and Raí.

Match details

External links
Report on LFP official site

1995
Coupe De La Ligue Final 1995
Coupe De La Ligue Final 1995
Coupe
May 1995 sports events in Europe
Football competitions in Paris
1995 in Paris